Kunai is a village in Jagdishpur block of Bhojpur district in Bihar, India. As of 2011, its population was 1,407, in 252 households.

References 

Villages in Bhojpur district, India